Diuridinae is an orchid subtribe in the tribe Diurideae.

References

External links 

 
Orchid subtribes